Moore Powell (died c. 1573), of Monmouth, was a Welsh politician.

He was a Member (MP) of the Parliament of England for Monmouth Boroughs in 1559, 1563 and 1572.

References

Year of birth missing
1570s deaths
16th-century Welsh politicians
People from Monmouth, Wales
English MPs 1559
English MPs 1563–1567
English MPs 1572–1583